Eumigus is a genus of grasshoppers in the family Pamphagidae. There are about five described species in Eumigus, found in southern Europe and North Africa.

Species
These five species belong to the genus Eumigus:
 Eumigus ayresi Bolívar, 1912
 Eumigus cucullatus (Bolívar, 1878)
 Eumigus monticola (Rambur, 1838)
 Eumigus punctatus (Bolívar, 1902)
 Eumigus rubioi Harz, 1973

References

Pamphagidae